Big Balloon is the fifth studio album by English indie rock band Dutch Uncles, released on 17 February 2017.

Track listing

Personnel
Dutch Uncles
Peter Broadhead – electric guitar, marimba
Andy Proudfoot – drums, backing vocals
Robin Richards – bass guitar, electric guitar, backing vocals
Duncan Wallis – lead vocals, piano

Additional musicians
Neil Wright - electric guitar
Henry Broadhead - synthesisers
John Purton - violin
Natalie Purton - violin
Jote Osahn - viola
Margit van der Zwan - cello
Helen Varley - horn
Harry Cunningham - tuba
Barry Hyde (The Futureheads) - backing vocals
Stealing Sheep - backing vocals
Everything Everything - backing vocals
Aldous RH - backing vocals

Technical personnel
Brendan Williams – production, engineering
Phil Bulleyment – production, engineering, mixing, mastering
Jamie Birkett – engineering, additional production
Louis Simmonds – engineering

References

2017 albums
Dutch Uncles albums
Memphis Industries albums